Megachile kruegeri is a species of bee in the family Megachilidae. It was described by Friese in 1923.

References

Kruegeri
Insects described in 1923